The New Dorp station is a Staten Island Railway station in the neighborhood of New Dorp, Staten Island, New York.

History 

The station opened on April 23, 1860, with the opening of the Staten Island Railway from Vanderbilt's Landing to Eltingville. It was rebuilt in 1889 by real estate developers Hughes and Ross who sought to build a depot designed to attract potential homebuyers. The former stationhouse that was in use until the 1965-1968 grade crossing elimination was moved to Historic Richmond Town, located at the three-way loop intersection of Arthur Kill Road, Richmond Road and Richmond Hill Road.

In 2019, the Metropolitan Transportation Authority announced that this station would become ADA-accessible as part of the agency's 2020–2024 Capital Program. A contract for two elevators at the station was awarded in December 2020.

Station layout
It is located on an open cut at New Dorp Lane and Railroad Avenue on the main line. It has two side platforms and orange colored walls and railings. Express trains begin the express section of their run at New Dorp in the morning rush hour, while some southbound trains may terminate here at the same time.

Exits
The north exit leads to New Dorp Lane where the station house is located, while the south exit leads to Rose Avenue. The south side is the only exit location where both staircases are not aligned together on one side of the street. The staircase to the northbound platform starts on the south side of Rose Avenue while the staircase to the southbound platform starts on the north side.

Bus connections

References

External links

Staten Island Railway station list
Staten Island Railway general information
 New Dorp Lane entrance from Google Maps Street View
 Rose Avenue entrance from Google Maps Street View
Platforms from Google Maps Street View

Staten Island Railway stations
Railway stations in the United States opened in 1860
1860 establishments in New York (state)
Relocated buildings and structures in New York City
New Dorp, Staten Island